The 1925 Allan Cup was the senior ice hockey championship for the Canadian Amateur Hockey Association (CAHA) during the 1924–25 season.

Change in format
In February 1925, CAHA vice-president Frank Sandercock submitted a proposal to change the Allan Cup finals to a best-of-three games format instead of a two-game series decided on total goals scored. Public sentiment at the time was that in a two-game series, a lucky break was enough to decide the series, whereas a best-of-three format was less likely for that to happen. CAHA president Silver Quilty announced that the change was approved by a special vote and was put into effect for the 1925 competition.

Final 
Port Arthur Bearcats beat University of Toronto 2-0 on series.

Port Arthur 4 University of Toronto 0
Port Arthur 3 University of Toronto 2

References

External links
Allan Cup archives 
Allan Cup website

 
Allan Cup
Allan Cup
Allan Cup 1925